Hermann Megenthaler (born 15 March 1952) is a Mexican sailor. He competed in the 470 event at the 1984 Summer Olympics.

References

External links
 

1952 births
Living people
Mexican male sailors (sport)
Olympic sailors of Mexico
Sailors at the 1984 Summer Olympics – 470
Place of birth missing (living people)